Slate is a ghost town in Bow Creek Township, Rooks County, Kansas, United States.

History
Slate was located in Bow Township along Slate Creek. A post office was issued to Slate in 1880. The post office was discontinued in 1903. Population in 1910 was 36.

References

Former populated places in Rooks County, Kansas
Former populated places in Kansas
1880 establishments in Kansas
Populated places established in 1880